Celia Hempton (born Stroud, England) is a British artist based in London and has exhibited internationally across Europe, Asia and North and South America. Hempton is primarily a painter but works across different medias including sound and performance. Her primary artistic interest is feelings of discomfort and confronting those feelings.

In 2016, Hempton was included in Vitamin P3 as one of 'tomorrow's artists'.

Education 
Hempton studied Fine Art at Glasgow School of Art from 2000-2003 where she also played in a band called I Love Lucy. Hempton then moved to London and completed her MA in Painting at the Royal College of Art from 2005-2007.

Work 
Hempton is most famous for her series 'Chat Random' (2014–ongoing), which consists of images of male genitalia found through the website Chatrandom.com. She cycles through the different live images of people she finds online using her laptop then begins to paint often using bright artificial colours. The works were first exhibited in 2014 and titled with the subject's country and the date she encountered them. Hempton sees this series as subverting the male gaze and uses her position as a woman to confront the taboo of painting a penis. The piece was included in Omar Kholeif's exhibition 'Electronic Superhighway (2016-1966) at the Whitechapel Gallery.

Her paintings vary in size, sometimes mimicking a mobile or laptop screen, other times taking up a large scale.

In 2014 Hempton collaborated with her brother Sam Hempton to create a sound piece, which was made after a few days spent on the Volcano island of Stromboli.

Awards 
 Civitella Ranieri Foundation residency, Umbria, Italy, 2014
 Sainsbury Scholarship in Painting, The British School at Rome, Italy, 2008 -2010
 Neville Burston Memorial Award, Royal College of Art, London, UK, 2007

References 

1981 births
Living people
Net.artists
Alumni of the Glasgow School of Art
Alumni of the Royal College of Art
21st-century British painters
People from Stroud
British women painters
21st-century British women artists
British contemporary artists